Charles Pile (born 5 April 1956) is a Barbadian former cyclist. He competed in the sprint and 1000m time trial events at the 1984 Summer Olympics.

References

External links
 

1963 births
Living people
Barbadian male cyclists
Olympic cyclists of Barbados
Cyclists at the 1984 Summer Olympics
Place of birth missing (living people)